The Bjugnfjorden is a fjord in Ørland Municipality in Trøndelag county, Norway. Other villages along the fjord include Nes and Uthaug. Bjugn Church is located on the southern shore of the fjord.

See also
 List of Norwegian fjords

References

Ørland
Fjords of Trøndelag